mocl is a programming language, a dialect and implementation of the language Lisp named Common Lisp. It is focused on mobile device platforms. It includes a compiler and runtime system. It currently runs on iOS, Android, and macOS.

History
mocl was first announced on November 14, 2012. The first release was timed to occur at Lisp universal time 3581000000 (June 23, 2013). The most recent release of mocl is named Paren Mage and was released on May 6, 2014, adding support for macOS application creation and a remote read–eval–print loop (REPL) that runs on the mobile device.

As of September 2021, the website of mocl appears inactive.

References

External links
 

Common Lisp implementations